Edward Leo Lyman III (born April 13, 1942) is an educator, historian, author, and philanthropist. He has taught and published books and articles on the history of the western United States for over 35 years. He received his doctorate from University of California, Riverside in 1981.

Educator
Lyman taught for 17 years at California State University, Riverside, and at the Victor Valley College. He is an emeritus professor of history at Victor Valley College and currently teaches classes part-time at University of Utah, Dixie.

Community service
Lyman is a member of the Washington County Historical Society in Washington County, Utah, and is the Utah State Director of the Old Spanish Trail Association.

Published works

References

External links

Historians of Utah
Historians of the American West
Historians of the Latter Day Saint movement
1942 births
Living people